Rodney Hall (writer) (born 1935), Australian writer
 Rodney Hall (politician) (born 1928), American politician in the state of South Dakota
 Rodney Bruce Hall (born 1960), American professor of international relations